PreQ1-III riboswitches are a class of riboswitches that bind pre-queuosine1 (PreQ1), a precursor to the modified nucleoside queuosine.
PreQ1-III riboswitches are the third class of riboswitches to be discovered that sense this ligand, and are structurally distinct from preQ1-I and preQ1-II riboswitches.
Most sequenced examples of preQ1-III riboswitches are obtained from uncultivated metagenome samples, but the few examples in cultivated organisms are present in strains that are known to or suspected to be Faecalibacterium prausnitzii, a species of Gram-positive Clostridia.
Known examples of preQ1-III riboswitches are found upstream of queT genes, which are expected  to encode transporters of a queuosine derivative.  The other two known classes of preQ1 riboswitches are also commonly found upstream of queT genes.

The atomic-resolution structure of a preQ1-III riboswitch has been solved by X-ray crystallography.

References

Cis-regulatory RNA elements
Riboswitch